Wu Qian may refer to:

 Wu Qian (military officer) (born 1973), Chinese military officer.
 Wu Qian (pianist) (born 1984), Chinese pianist
 Wu Qian (basketball, born 1986), Chinese basketball player
 Wu Qian (basketball, born 1994), Chinese basketball player
 Janice Wu (born 1992), Chinese actress

See also
Wuqian Commandery, see History of the administrative divisions of China before 1912